Phyllonorycter tauricus is a moth of the family Gracillariidae. It is known from Turkey.

The larvae feed on Ostrya carpinifolia. They mine the leaves of their host plant.

References

Moths described in 2013
tauricus
Moths of Asia